The cabinet of Prime Minister  Josef Tošovský was in power from 2 January to 22 July 1998. It was a caretaker government formed after fall of Václav Klaus' Second Cabinet. It led the Czech Republic until snap election in June 1998. Cabinet consisted of independents and members of Civic Democratic Party, Christian and Democratic Union – Czechoslovak People's Party and Civic Democratic Alliance. Members of the cabinet that belonged to Civic Democratic Party later formed Freedom Union.

Government ministers

References

Czech government cabinets
Civic Democratic Party (Czech Republic)
Freedom Union – Democratic Union
KDU-ČSL
Civic Democratic Alliance